Kahrizak (also Romanized as Kahrīzak) is a village in Baghestan Rural District, in the Central District of Bavanat County, Fars Province, Iran. At the 2006 census, its population was 26, in 7 families.

References 

Populated places in Bavanat County